Markella Kavenagh (born January 30, 2000) is an Australian actress. She is best known for her starring role as the harfoot Nori Brandyfoot in The Lord of the Rings: The Rings of Power.

Career
After appearing in several television shows, Kavenagh landed her first film role with True History of the Kelly Gang (2019) as Jane Cotter. In July 2019, she gained attention when she was cast as  Elanor "Nori" Brandyfoot in The Lord of the Rings: The Rings of Power (2022), becoming the first actress to be attached in the high-profile project.

Filmography

Film

Television

References

External links
 

1994 births
21st-century Australian actresses
Australian actors
Living people
Place of birth missing (living people)